Jitka Karlíková is a female former international table tennis player from Czechoslovakia.

Table tennis career
She won a bronze medal at the 1969 World Table Tennis Championships in the women's doubles with Ilona Uhlíková-Voštová.

She also won three European Championship medals including a gold medal in 1968.

See also
 List of table tennis players
 List of World Table Tennis Championships medalists

References

Czech female table tennis players
1947 births
People from Litomyšl
Living people
World Table Tennis Championships medalists
Sportspeople from the Pardubice Region